Mantas Mockevičius (born 16 January 1993) is a Lithuanian basketball player who plays at the point guard position. He last played for Úrvalsdeild karla club Keflavík during the 2018–19 season.

Playing career 
Mockevičius started his career with Palangos in 2008 in the second-tier NKL. The team was promoted in 2010 and after spending the 2010–2011 season in the LKL and the Baltic Basketball League, he joined Olney Central College in the United States during the summer. He returned to Palangos in December 2011 and finished the season with the club. During the 2012–2013 season, Mockevičius started 23 of 35 games in the LKL and the Baltic Basketball League, averaging 11.8 points and 3.2 assists.

After being without a team for the first half of the 2013–2014 season, Mockevičius joined KK Vrsac Swisslion of the Basketball League of Serbia in February 2014. He spent the first half of the 2014–2015 season with BC Vilnius in the NKL, averaging 8.7 points and 2.0 assists in 9 games.

During the summer of 2018, Mockevičius started training with Keflavík and in September the club signed him for the 2018–2019 season where he instantly became a fan favorite. Mockevičius appeared in 10 regular season games, averaging 5.2 points per game, helping Keflavík to a 4th place finish and a home court advantage in the first round of the playoffs. On 20 March, the head coach of Keflavík, Sverrir Þór Sverrisson, stated that Mockevičius was AWOL from the team and would therefore not play for it again this season.

National team career 
Mockevičius played in 2013 FIBA Europe Under-20 Championship for Lithuania men's national under-20 and at the 2010 Summer Youth Olympics.

Personal life 

After finishing professional basketball career Mantas Mockevicius is currently managing recruitment company in Lithuania, as well construction service company in Iceland. His marital status is unknown. Currently he does not have active social media accounts. Mantas has younger brother Emilis.

References

External links
Profile at realgm.com
Olney Central statistics at njcaa.org
Icelandic statistics at Icelandic Basketball Federation

1993 births
Living people
Keflavík men's basketball players
KK Hemofarm players
Lithuanian expatriate basketball people in Iceland
Lithuanian expatriate basketball people in the United States
Lithuanian men's basketball players
Point guards
Úrvalsdeild karla (basketball) players